Turkestan is a region in Central Asia historically populated by Turkic peoples.

Turkestan or Turkistan may also refer to:
Turkistan Region, a province in Kazakhstan
Turkistan (city), its administrative capital
East Turkestan, a region in China
Afghan Turkestan, a region in Afghanistan
Turkestan Province, a former province in Afghanistan
Turkestan Autonomous Soviet Socialist Republic, a former republic in the Soviet Union
Turkestan Military District, a former district in Russian Central Asia
Reichskommissariat Turkestan, a projected Reichskommissariat proposed by ideologist Alfred Rosenberg for Nazi Germany to create in the Central Asian Republics of the Soviet Union

Former countries
 First East Turkestan Republic
 Second East Turkestan Republic
 Turkestan Autonomous Soviet Socialist Republic, in the Soviet Union
 Turkestan Autonomy